Ryan Roberts (born June 12, 1992) is an American double-mini trampoline gymnast who has represented his nation at international competitions. At the 2011 Trampoline World Championships he won the bronze medal in the team double-mini event and at the 2013 Trampoline World Championships he won the gold medal in the team double-mini event.

References

1992 births
Living people
American male trampolinists
Place of birth missing (living people)
Medalists at the Trampoline Gymnastics World Championships
21st-century American people